Scalopognathus multituberculatus is a therocephalian from the Early Triassic of the Komi Republic of Russia. It was first named and described in 1974 by Leonid Tatarinov from a singular lower jaw. He later found more material, including a partial skull and a few vertebrae, belonging to this species. It is currently the only species in the genus Scalopognathus.

References 

Therapsid genera
Monotypic genera